Krasny Kutok is a rural locality (a selo) and the administrative center of Krasnokutskoye Rural Settlement, Borisovsky District, Belgorod Oblast, Russia. The population was 556 as of 2010. There are 8 streets.

Geography 
Krasny Kutok is located 13 km northwest of Borisovka (the district's administrative centre) by road. Vakovshchina is the nearest rural locality.

References 

Rural localities in Borisovsky District